Hakdong·Jeungsimsa station is a station on Line 1 of the Gwangju Metro in Hak-dong, Gwangju, South Korea. It opened on April 28, 2004.

Name origin
Jeungsimsa is situated in Hakdong. Hakdong was originally called Hakmaeul ("crane village") as it is a hill area on the Mudeung Mountain that looks like a crane. Since 1947, Hakmaeul has been renamed Hakdong·Jeungsimsa.

Features
Its simple image with simple decoration gives a familiar and comfortable impression. Various signs and billboards act as background scenery. The consistent use of materials and decorative patterns gives a simple and neat image.

Surrounding area
Nammunno is the axis that connects the downtown-bound and Hwasunn-bound planning line. In the west are neighborhood market facilities and in the east are high-rise apartments and greenery.

Station layout

See also
 Gwangju Metro
 Transportation in South Korea

References

External links 

 Gwangju Metropolitan Rapid Transit Corporation in English
 Gwangju Subway Cyber Station in English
 Route Map in Korean

Gwangju Metro stations
Dong District, Gwangju
Railway stations opened in 2004